Released in 1998, Imagined Oceans is an album by Welsh composer Karl Jenkins. This work was inspired by thirteen lunar mare for which the tracks are titled. The musical style is similar to Jenkins's Adiemus compositions and each track explores the meaning of its Latin name through various musical techniques. Unlike most of the Adiemus pieces, the lyrics for Imagined Oceans consist of syllables from the tracks' titles rather than invented text.

Instrumentation

 recorder
 Two percussionists playing:
 cymbals
 bongos
 tambourine
 timbales
 güiro
 triangle
 mark tree
 wind chimes
 sizzle cymbals
 Chinese cymbals
 bass drum
 tam-tam
 tablas
 pandeiro
 crotales
 strings

Track listing
"Mare Crisium Introitus" (Sea of Crises) – 2:51
"Lacus Serenitatis" (Lake of Serenity) – 4:52
"Mare Vaporum" (Sea of Vapours) – 4:27
"Mare Australis" (Southern Sea) – 6:41
"Lacus Somniorum" (Lake of Dreams) – 2:39
"Lacus Pereverantiae" (Lake of Perseverance) – 8:41
"Lacus Doloris" (Lake of Sorrow) – 4:55
"Mare Undarum" (Sea of Waves) – 4:54
"Palus Nebularum" (Marsh of Mists) – 3:09
"Sinus Iridium" (Bay of Rainbows) – 2:13
"Mare Imbrium" (Sea of Showers) – 4:46
"Lacus Temporis" (Lake of Time) – 5:11
"Lacus Lenitatis" (Lake of Tenderness) – 3:24
"Mare Crisium" (Sea of Crises) – 5:39

Personnel
Karl Jenkins Ensemble
Nic Pendlebury – Conductor
Pamela Thorby – Recorder
Sarah Eyden – Soprano
Micaela Haslam – Mezzo-Soprano
Heather Cairncross – Alto

Alternate versions
Jenkins has used the theme from several tracks in his other works. "Lacus Pereverantiae" shares its theme with "The Dagda" from Adiemus IV: The Eternal Knot. "Palus Nebularum" shares its theme with "Isle of the Mystic Lake" also from The Eternal Knot.

External links
Karl Jenkins

1998 classical albums
Karl Jenkins albums